Alexander Merensky (8 June 1837 in Panten near Liegnitz – 22 May 1918 in Berlin) was a German missionary, working in South Africa (Transvaal) since 1859.

Life
Alexander was orphaned early in life and grew up among relatives. In 1855, he entered the mission seminary of the Berlin Missionary Society and was sent out on 23 November 1858. Together with a fellow missionary, Karl-Heinrich Theodor Grützner, he travelled by sailboat from Amsterdam to Cape Town and on to Natal.

On 14 August 1860, he co-founded the mission station Gerlachshoop, the first mission station of the Berlin Missionary Society north of the Vaal River, together with Grützner. Merensky was ordained as missionary in Gerlachshoop on 11 January 1861. A further mission station, Kgalatlou/ Schoonoord, was dedicated in August 1861. On 15 October 1863 Merensky was married to Marie Liers from Breslau. Seven children were born to this union, among them as fourth child Hans Merensky. They lived in Kgalatlou until May 1864 and with the permission of Sekhukhune, the leader of the Bapedi, founded the mission station Ga-Ratau, approximately 15 km from the Bapedi capital. This station was dedicated in May 1864.

However, shortly thereafter the first persecutions of the Christians started, and Merensky had to flee with his family and congregation in the night of 23 November 1864 from Ga-Ratau. Merensky bought from own means in January 1865 a farm in the district of Middelburg in the Transvaal Republic (ZAR). Together with Missionary Grützner he built the mission station Botshabelo - a Northern Sotho word for "place of refuge". On the hill overlooking Botshabelo, a fort was erected which Merensky called "Fort Wilhelm" in honour of the German kaiser; it in now known as Fort Merensky. During 1869 a blacksmith's shop, a workshop to build and repair wagons and a mill were built, allowing nearby villagers and members of the congregation to learn these skills.

The British annexed the Transvaal Republic in 1876 and Sir Wolseley made Botshabelo his headquarters in the Transvaal. During the First Anglo-Boer War, Merensky was conscripted to the Boer forces as military medic. He took part in the battles of Laing's Nek, Skuinshoogte and Majuba Hill and described the battles viewed from afar from his field hospital. After the end of the war, he was mistrusted by both the British and Boer authorities and decided to move back to Germany with his family. In 1883 he was promoted to Inspector of the Berlin Missionary Society.

In 1890 he travelled to the northern shore of Lake Njassa (now known as Lake Malawi in Malawi) in the area called Kondeland. Here he founded two further mission stations, Wangemannshöhe and Manow. Being interested in geography, he later also published a map of this area. On his way back to Germany he had another opportunity to visit Botshabelo.

He received honorary doctorates from universities in Berlin and Heidelberg for his scientific publications. Merensky died in Berlin and was buried in the cemetery of the Kaiser Wilhelm Memorial Church in Berlin.

External links
 History of Botshabelo
 Botshabelo today
 Berlin Missionary Society in South Africa

1837 births
1918 deaths
German Lutheran missionaries
People of the First Boer War
German expatriates in South Africa
Lutheran missionaries in South Africa
19th-century Lutherans